More than This may refer to:

 "More Than This" (Roxy Music song), a 1982 single by British art rock band Roxy Music
 "More Than This" (TV series), a 2022 Australian television series
 "More than This" (One Direction song), a song by British-Irish boy band One Direction
 "More than This", a song by Peter Gabriel from Up
 "More than This", a song by The Cure from The X-Files: The Album
 "More than This", a song by Vanessa Carlton from her album Heroes & Thieves
 More than This (compilation album), a 1995 compilation album featuring music by Roxy Music and Bryan Ferry
 More than This (Trading Yesterday album)
 More Than This (novel), a 2013 young-adult novel by Patrick Ness